Jenna Teresa-Marie Szczesny (born May 17, 1997) is an American soccer player who last played as a striker for Chicago Red Stars of the National Women's Soccer League (NWSL).

Club career 
Chicago Red Stars drafted Szczesny in 2019.

References

External links 
 Loyola profile
 

Living people
1997 births
Women's association football forwards
Chicago Red Stars players
National Women's Soccer League players
Chicago Red Stars draft picks
American women's soccer players
Loyola Ramblers women's soccer players
21st-century American women